River with Trees is a brown wash landscape drawing by Rembrandt, dating to c. 1654-1655 and now in the Louvre in Paris.

Sources

Landscape art
Drawings by Rembrandt
1654 works
1655 works
Drawings of the Louvre